IET Information Security is a bimonthly peer-reviewed scientific journal covering information security and cryptography. It was established in 2005 as IEE Proceedings - Information Security, obtaining its current name in 2007. It is published by the Institution of Engineering and Technology and the editor-in-chief is Yvo Desmedt (University College London).

Abstracting and indexing
The journal is abstracted and indexed in:

According to the Journal Citation Reports, the journal has a 2017 impact factor of 0.890.

References

External links

Bimonthly journals
Computer science in the United Kingdom
Computer science journals
English-language journals
Institution of Engineering and Technology academic journals
Publications established in 2005